The Vagabonds (German: Die Landstreicher) is a 1937 German operetta film directed by Karel Lamac and starring Paul Hörbiger, Lucie Englisch and Gretl Theimer. It is an adaptation of the 1899 operetta of the same name by Carl Michael Ziehrer.

Location shooting took place around Lake Schliersee.

Cast
 Paul Hörbiger as Haselhof 
 Lucie Englisch as Steffi 
 Erika Druzovic as Julliane Marie 
 Rudolf Carl as Kasimir 
 Rudolf Platte as Brack 
 Gretl Theimer as Christl 
 Wastl Witt as Stolzingen 
 Walter Grüters as Nieder 
 Leo Peukert as Bürgermeister 
 Werner Finck as Der Graf

See also
The Vagabonds (1916)

References

Bibliography 
 Bock, Hans-Michael & Bergfelder, Tim. The Concise CineGraph. Encyclopedia of German Cinema. Berghahn Books, 2009.

External links 
 

1937 films
Films of Nazi Germany
German musical comedy films
1937 musical comedy films
1930s German-language films
Films directed by Karel Lamač
Films shot in Bavaria
Operetta films
Films based on operettas
Remakes of Austrian films
Sound film remakes of silent films
German black-and-white films
1930s German films